The , also known as  or , are a set of characters discovered around 1886 on the Japanese island of Hokkaido. At the time of their discovery, they were believed to be a genuine script, but this view is not generally supported today.

Discovery and research 
Enomoto Takeaki opined that these must have been characters used by the Emishi a thousand years before. At the 25th meeting of the Tokyo Anthropological Society in December of that year, Shōji displayed pieces of leather, stone fragments, washi (Japanese paper), and a sheath, all inscribed with the characters.

The anthropologist Tsuboi Shōgorō published an article in 1887 in the 12th issue of the Tokyo Anthropological Society Report that used the Hokkaido characters, along with carvings in Temiya Cave and Oshoro Stone Circle in Otaru City, to support his own Koro-pok-guru theory. This theory argued that the Koro-pok-guru, a legendary race of small people in Ainu mythology, were in fact residents of Japan predating the Ainu themselves, and had been forced to the northeast by the immigration of the Ainu's ancestors.

In August 1887, Tsuboi went on to publish an article in the 18th issue of the Tokyo Anthropological Society Magazine entitled . In addition to stating that the characters were systematically arranged, unlike those at Temiya Cave, and thus represented a script, he further suggested the possibility that these characters were used by people who came to Japan from Eurasia.

In October of the same year, this time in the 20th issue of that same Tokyo Anthropological Society Magazine, Shōji himself released an article called . Although he admitted that there was no proof, Shōji expressed the view that these characters were likely used by the Emishi in ancient times.

In 1888, the Kokugaku scholar Naosumi Ochiai wrote a book entitled . Therein he posited that the Hokkaido characters were used by the Emishi people, who neither understood Japanese nor used Kanji. He further produced 14 symbols, combinations of which supposedly composed 50 of the characters, but supposed that it would prove impossible to understand them without knowing their readings. In the appendix on dubious characters in Hirata Atsutane's , he suggested a connection between the Hokkaido characters and Izumo characters, as well as other supposedly ancient characters.

In 1975, Kiyohiko Agō wrote , in which he connected the Hokkaido characters with not only the carvings in Temiya Cave but also those in Fugoppe Cave, in the town of Yoichi.

The , headed by Takahashi Yoshinori, claims a connection between jindai moji including the Hokkaido characters and an advanced prehistoric society, and further between the Hokkaido characters and the ancient Sumerian and Assyrian civilizations of Mesopotamia. Furthermore, they claim that the carvings in the Fugoppe Cave themselves consist of the Hokkaido characters.

In 2007, the author Harada Minoru, a member of the skeptical group Togakkai (the "Academy of Outrageous Books"), offered the following evaluation:

Overview of inscribed artifacts 
The names and descriptions of these are mostly from Shōji (1887).

Related characters

Temiya cave drawings 

By one theory, the rock art discovered in 1866 in Temiya Cave actually consists of written characters. These carvings in Otaru are relics of the continuing Jōmon culture which persisted in the region from the 3rd century BC until the 7th century AD, when it was replaced by Satsumon culture. In 1921, they were designated a national historical landmark. They became public knowledge after an 1878 investigation conducted by Enomoto Takeaki, the secretary of the Kaitakushi (Hokkaido Development Commission) Yamanouchi Teiun, and the British geologist John Milne.

In October 1913, the archaeologist Torii Ryūzō contributed an article to Volume 22, Issue 4 of  entitled . He claimed that the letters were in the old Turkic alphabet, representing a Tungusic languages used by the Mohe people. Adopting Torii's Turkic theory, he claimed to have deciphered the carvings in Temiya Cave, and that in the Mohe language they read:  In that month's Otaru Shinbun newspaper, Nakanome asserted that the Mishihase people subjugated in the Nihon Shoki by Abe no Hirafu were in fact Mohe people, and that Temiya Cave is the ruins of the burial place of their chief, who died in the conflict.

On the other hand, in 1944, the local historian Fumihiro Asaeda published , in which he propounded a theory that the carvings in Temiya Cavern represented ancient Chinese hanzi. By his theory, they were made by people of the Zhou dynasty court, and record that a fleet dispatched on an expedition was visiting the area when the  who led them died and was buried. After some calamity occurred, the Zhou held a bloody ritual. He further conjectured that ships from Shang and later Zhou China frequently visited Hokkaido to obtain deer antlers for use in rituals.

In 1972, Asaeda published a further work in which he indicated three more items he believed to contain characters of the same type. He supposed that all of these were ancient records of ceremonies conducted for the dead.

The jindai moji researcher Tatsuo Sōma offered another theory in 1978, when he published . He argued that the carvings in Temiya Cave were made by members of a group of people chased from the Hokuriku region by another group of originating in Baekje. He also shared his interpretations of the meanings of the carvings; Unoke, Noto, Kaga, and the other places he refers to by name are all located in modern Ishikawa prefecture.

Fugoppe cave drawings 

In October 1927, rock carvings were discovered on stone walls inside a hill in Fugoppe in the town of Yoichi, by a railroad worker who dug a path through it. However, the ethnic Ainu folk researcher Hokuto Iboshi argued that the "deformed letters" were instead more recent forgeries, citing their lack of weathering compared to those at Temiya Cave.

Tatsuo Sōma opined that these carvings, like those at Temiya Cave, were made by people driven from the northeast of Honshū. He interpreted their meaning as 

In 1950, further rock art was discovered in Fugoppe Cave in the same town. These were confirmed, like those at Temiya Cave, to be relics of the continued Jōmon period, and designated as national treasures in 1953. These carvings, like those at Temiya Cave, are sometimes referred to as "ancient characters".

Tatsuo Sōma considered these too as made by the same group that created the carvings at Temiya and at the 1927 Fugoppe discovery. Part of his translation is as follows:

The Japan Exploration Association, chaired by Takahashi Yoshinori, contends that the inscriptions on the northern wall of Fugoppe Cave read as "iishishirai" and "kawasakanahakitsu", and mean respectively "edible beasts live here" and "freshwater fish come here".

Notes

References

Further reading 

History of Hokkaido
Japanese writing system
Jindai moji
Undeciphered writing systems